Islam in French Polynesia is a small religious minority in the territory of French Polynesia. There are an estimated 500 Muslims in French Polynesia, most of which are in Tahiti, where the only mosque exists in Papeete. The mosque opened in 2013 and its imam is Hicham el-Berkani, a 23-year old Moroccan-born citizen from France. In recent years there has been a strong tension between the French Polynesian Christians and the Muslims, even though the government gives the right to the freedom of religion and the freedom to create religious associations.

References 

Polynesia
+French Polynesia
Religion in French Polynesia